The 2022–23 Notre Dame Fighting Irish men's basketball team represented the University of Notre Dame, located in Notre Dame, Indiana, in the 2022–23 NCAA Division I men's basketball season. The team was led by head coach Mike Brey, in his 23rd and final season as head coach, and played home games at the on-campus Joyce Center as members of the Atlantic Coast Conference (ACC).

Previous season

The Fighting Irish finished the 2021–22 season 24–11, 15–5 in ACC Play to finish a tie for second place. As the No. 2 seed, they lost in the quarterfinals of the ACC tournament to Virginia Tech. They received an at-large bid to the NCAA tournament as the No. 11 seed in the West Region, where they defeated Rutgers in the First Four and then upset Alabama to advance to the Second Round where they lost to Texas Tech.

Offseason

Departures

Incoming transfers

Recruiting classes

2022 recruiting class

2023 recruiting class

Roster

Schedule and results

|-
!colspan=12 style=| Exhibition

|-
!colspan=12 style=| Regular season

|-
!colspan=12 style=| ACC Tournament

Source

Rankings

*AP does not release post-NCAA Tournament rankings

References

Notre Dame Fighting Irish men's basketball seasons
Notre Dame
Notre Dame Fighting Irish men's basketball